Robert Cowell (5 December 1922 – 11 January 1996) was an English football defender. During his football career he only played for one club, Newcastle United. Despite his success with Newcastle he failed to win any caps for the England national team.

Career
Cowell was born in Trimdon Grange and worked as a coalminer at Blackhall Colliery as a teenager, as well as playing for the non-league football team Blackhall Colliery Welfare. He joined Newcastle in October 1943 at the age of 20 – a time when the club were only playing friendly matches as World War II meant all the football leagues in England were suspended. He made 81 appearances for Newcastle as a right-back.

He made his Football League debut on 1 February 1947 in a match against Barnsley and would feature a further 12 times before the end of the season. He only played 19 league games for the rest of the following season as Newcastle were promoted into the First Division. However, he bided his time and became the club's first choice right-back for the 1948–49 season.

Along with Jackie Milburn and Bobby Mitchel Cowell featured in all three of Newcastle's FA Cup successes during the 1950s. He won his first FA Cup winners medal in 1951 when Newcastle beat Blackpool 2–0 and the following year he was part of the team that surprised Arsenal and the first team to retain the cup since 1891. He won his third FA Cup title in 1955 against Manchester City.

Retirement and death
Bobby Cowell was forced to retire in 1955 at the age of 33 when he picked up a serious knee injury during a pre-season tour of Germany. He had made 330 appearances for Newcastle.

One of Newcastle United's top goalscorers of all time, Jackie Milburn, stated that Cowell was "the best uncapped fullback I've ever known".

Bobby Cowell died on 11 January 1996 in Newcastle upon Tyne, aged 73.

Career statistics

A.  The "Other" column constitutes appearances and goals in the Charity Shield and Coronation Cup.

Honours

As a player
Newcastle United
 FA Cup winner: 1951, 1952, 1955

References

External links
 Spartacus entry''
 FA Cup Finals

1922 births
1996 deaths
English footballers
English Football League players
Association football defenders
Newcastle United F.C. players
English miners
People from Trimdon
Footballers from County Durham
Blackhall Colliery Welfare F.C. players
FA Cup Final players